Ellen Mary Stack  (born 4 May 1929) is an Australian medical doctor and the first female Lord Mayor of an Australian capital city. She was the mayor of the City of Darwin, Northern Territory from 1975 to 1979, and lord mayor from 1979 to 1980. She is best known for her work following the destruction of Darwin due to Cyclone Tracy.

Early life 
Stack was born in Sydney in 1929, the daughter of William and Elizabeth Stack. She attended Brigidine Convent in Randwick and went on to study piano at the Conservatorium of Music in Sydney

Stack married Thomas (Tom) Lawler, an agricultural scientist, in 1957. They have three sons.

Medical career 
Stack graduated in 1956 with a Bachelor of Medicine, Bachelor of Surgery from the University of Sydney where she was a resident at Sancta Sophia College. She then became a Fellow of the Royal Australian College of General Practitioners and worked in obstetrics and gynecology. She worked in Wee Waa and Narrabri in the Namoi Valley before moving to Darwin in 1961. Working at a clinic in Parap, she was one of only two private practitioners in Darwin at the time.

After her time as Lord Mayor of Darwin, she completed a Masters of Public Health from the University of Sydney. She then returned to Darwin, becoming the first Assistant Secretary of the Division of Aboriginal Health at the Department of Health of the Northern Territory. She became the Chief Medical Officer of the Northern Territory in 1987. Stack was instrumental in the establishment of Menzies School of Health in 1985.

Stack wrote about and commented publicly on public health and community issues such as abortion and women rights.

Cyclone Tracy and life in Darwin 
After moving to Darwin in 1961, Stack became increasingly interested in politics. She was elected to the Darwin City Council in 1969 and became Deputy Mayor in 1974.

Stack and her family survived Cyclone Tracy, despite the destruction of their house. Stack decided not to evacuate Darwin, instead running an emergency clinic at Darwin High School, which became the main shelter and evacuation centre after the cyclone. She was responsible for the health care of 11,000 people who passed through the centre. "Not only did I look after the people that came in, but also people came and lived here," she said. "They brought their sodden old mattresses with them... I used to do a ward round every day and call them the sodden mattress lot."

Stack was pivotal in establishing the Darwin Disaster Welfare Council, that would later become the Northern Territory Women's Advisory Council. Stack became involved in reconstruction efforts. She was elected mayor of the City of Darwin in May 1975 and automatically became a member of the Darwin Reconstruction Commission.

Stack was re-elected Mayor of Darwin on 30 April 1978. Stack became the first Lord Mayor of Darwin in 1979 when it became a capital city. She was the first female Lord Mayor of an Australian capital city. Stack was made Commander of the Order of the British Empire in 1979 for services rendered to the people of Darwin following the cyclone.

Stack resigned as Lord Mayor in May 1980 to run for the Country Liberal Party as candidate in the seat of Fannie Bay in the June election. She lost to the incumbent, Pam O'Neil.

In 1985, Stack served as the Northern Territory representative on the first National Australia Day Council.

References

External links 
 Ella Stack's Manuscripts at Northern Territory Library.
 

1929 births
Living people
Mayors and Lord Mayors of Darwin
Australian public health doctors
Australian Commanders of the Order of the British Empire
University of Sydney alumni
Sydney Medical School alumni
Northern Territory local councillors
Cyclone Tracy
Women local councillors in Australia
Women mayors of places in the Northern Territory
Medical doctors from Sydney
Politicians from Sydney
Women public health doctors